Akiv Ali is an Indian film editor who works in Bollywood.

Career
Akiv is a film editor in Bollywood, he is known for editing Once Upon a Time in Mumbaai. He worked as actor in a film Rog in 2005.

Akiv's debut directorial De De Pyaar De, starring Ajay Devgn, Tabu and Rakul Preet Singh released on 17 May 2019.

Filmography

As editor
 Kash Aap Hamare Hote (2003)
 Saaya (2003)
 Footpath (2003)
 Inteha (2003)
 Paap (2003)
 Murder (2004)
 Tumsa Nahin Dekha: A Love Story (2004)
 Madhoshi (2004)
 Rog (2005)
 Zeher (2005)
 Koi Tujh Sa Kahaan (2005)
 Kalyug (2005)
 Gangster (2006)
 The Killer (2006)
 Woh Lamhe (2006)
 Life in a... Metro (2007)
 Khulay Asmaan Kay Neechay (2008)
 I Hate Luv Storys (2010)
 Once Upon a Time in Mumbaai (2010)
 The Dirty Picture (2011)
 Pyaar Ka Punchnama (2011)
 Love Mein Gum (2011)
 Agneepath (2012)
 Barfi! (2012)
 Akaash Vani (2013)
 Yeh Jawaani Hai Deewani (2013)
 Once Upon ay Time in Mumbai Dobaara! (2013)
 Gori Tere Pyaar Mein! (2013)
 Bang Bang! (2014)
 Brothers (2015) 
 Pyaar Ka Punchnama 2 (2015)
 Kaabil (2017)
 Sonu Ke Titu Ki Sweety (2018)
 De De Pyaar De (2019)
 Laxmmi Bomb (2020)
 Chhalaang (2020)
 Tu Jhoothi Main Makkaar (2023)

As Director
 De De Pyaar De (2019)

As actor
 Rog (2005)

References

External links
 

Hindi film editors
Living people
Film directors from Delhi
1981 births
Film editors from Delhi